Valniš  is a village in the municipality of Babušnica, Serbia. According to the 2002 census, the village has a population of  97 people.

References 

Populated places in Pirot District